Soula, Burkina Faso may refer to:

 Soula, Bazèga
 Soula, Boulkiemdé
 Soula, Gnagna